The 2016 Hawaii Tennis Open was a professional tennis tournament played on outdoor hard courts. It was the 1st edition of the tournament and part of the 2016 WTA 125K series, offering a total of $115,000 in prize money. It took place in Honolulu, United States, on 21–27 November 2016.

Singles main draw entrants

Seeds 

 1 Rankings as of 14 November 2016.

Other entrants 
The following player received a wildcard into the singles main draw:
  Usue Maitane Arconada
  Ingrid Neel
  Fanny Stollár
  Katie Swan
  Zhang Shuai

The following players received entry from the qualifying draw:
  Michaela Gordon
  Zhang Nannan

Doubles entrants

Seeds 

 1 Rankings as of 14 November 2016.

Other entrants 
The following pair received a wildcard into the doubles main draw:
  Wen Xin /  Zhang Nannan

Champions

Singles

 Catherine Bellis def.  Zhang Shuai, 6–4, 6–2

Doubles

 Eri Hozumi /  Miyu Kato def.  Nicole Gibbs /  Asia Muhammad, 6–7(3–7), 6–3, [10–8]

External links 
 Official website

Hawaii Tennis Open
2016 WTA 125K series
2016 in American tennis
2016 in sports in Hawaii
November 2016 sports events in the United States